Hegra Station is a railway station on the Meråker Line in the village of Hegra in the municipality of Stjørdal in Trøndelag county, Norway. The station was opened on 17 October 1881 as Hegre. It received the current name on 1 June 1919, and has been unmanned since 1 March 1971.

It is served twice a day in each direction by SJ Norge.

References

Railway stations in Stjørdal
Railway stations on the Meråker Line
Railway stations opened in 1881
1881 establishments in Norway